Stereoblood (also released as Solitude of Blood) is a 2002 Russian thriller film directed by Roman Prygunov. It was entered into the 24th Moscow International Film Festival.

Cast
 Ingeborga Dapkunaite as Maria
 Yuriy Kutsenko as Vladimir
 Vyacheslav Razbegaev as Viktor
 Oksana Fandera as Greta
 Lev Prygunov as Director
 Roman Radov as Doctor
 Elvira Bolgova as Girl the student
 Mariya Syomkina as Girl the musician
 Natalya Rogozhkina as Girl on the ice

References

External links
 

2002 films
2002 thriller films
2000s Russian-language films
Russian thriller films